My Wife's Enemy is a 1959 Italian comedy film directed by Gianni Puccini.

Cast
 Marcello Mastroianni - Marco Tornabuoni
 Giovanna Ralli - Luciana, sua moglie
 Vittorio De Sica - Ottavio Terenzi, padre di Marco
 Memmo Carotenuto - Nando Terenzi, padre di Lucia
 Luciana Paluzzi - Giulia
 Andrea Checchi - Dr. Giuliani
 Teddy Reno - Himself
 Giacomo Furia - Peppino
 Riccardo Garrone - Michele
 Raimondo Vianello - Mister La Corata
 Enzo Garinei - Scienziato tedesco
 Gisella Sofio - Worker

References

External links

1959 films
1950s Italian-language films
1959 comedy films
Italian black-and-white films
Films directed by Gianni Puccini
Italian comedy films
1950s Italian films